Let's Go Eat the Factory is the 16th album by Dayton, Ohio rock group Guided by Voices. The album was first released on December 20, 2011 digitally through the iTunes Store, then by mail-order on January 1, 2012, and finally released retail on January 24, 2012. The album is the first since their 2004 dissolution, and the first to feature the band's classic lineup since 1996's Under the Bushes Under the Stars.  The album was produced by the band and recorded at the homes of members Tobin Sprout, Mitch Mitchell, and Greg Demos. As with previous albums, it features the band's famously lo-fi 4-track sound as well as more modern production. It is also the first Guided by Voices album to be released under the Guided by Voices, Inc. label.

The album debuted at #17 on Billboard's Top Heatseekers chart and #24 on Billboard's Tastemaker Albums chart. It eventually reached #8 on Heatseekers, #5 on Tastemaker Albums and #35 on Billboard's Top Independent Albums chart.

Track listing

References

External links
First Listen at NPR

Guided by Voices albums
2011 albums
Self-released albums
Fire Records (UK) albums